The men's flyweight event was part of the boxing programme at the 1920 Summer Olympics.  The weight class was the lightest contested, and allowed boxers of up to 112 pounds (50.8 kilograms). The competition was held from August 21, 1920, to August 24, 1920. 16 boxers from nine nations competed.

Results

References

Sources
 
 

Flyweight